Bhupal Todi or Bhoopal Todi is a Hindustani classical raga. This raga is quite different from Bhopali (or Bhoop). The Carnatic music equivalent of Bhupal Todi musical scale is Bhupalam.

Theory

Arohana and Avarohana 
The scale of Bhupal Todi uses only komal swaras. It is a symmetric scale.
 Arohana : S r g P d S
 Avarohana : S d P g r S

Vadi and samavadi 
 Vadi : Dha
 Samavadi : Ga

Organization and relationships 
Thaat: Bhairavi.
Note: the raga Bhopal Todi is Todi-Ang raga. So it is suggested that one must assume this raga from "Thaat Todi". It may be more appropriate.

Behavior

Samay (Time) 
This scale is sung in the morning.

Film songs

Tamil

References 

2. Bor, Joep (ed). Rao, Suvarnalata; der Meer, Wim van; Harvey, Jane (co-authors) The Raga Guide: A Survey of 74 Hindustani Ragas. Zenith Media, London: 1999.

External links 
 SRA on Samay and Ragas
 SRA on Ragas and Thaats
 Rajan Parrikar on Ragas

Tp